is a former Japanese baseball first baseman and outfielder.

Early life
Tanaka went to high school at Chiben Gakuen High School in Japan and went to college at Osaka Shogyo University in Japan.

See also

References

External links

1954 births
Living people
Japanese baseball players
Nippon Professional Baseball outfielders
Hanshin Tigers players